Gaius Licinius Macer (died 66BC) was a Roman annalist and politician.

Life
A member of the ancient plebeian clan Licinia, he was tribune in 73BC. Sallust mentions him agitating for the people's rights. He became praetor in 68BC, but in 66BC Cicero succeeded in convicting him of bribery and extortion, upon which Macer committed suicide.

Work
Macer wrote a history of Rome, in 16 books. The work is now lost, but from Livy and Dionysius who both used it, we know that it began with the founding of the city, and that Pyrrhus appeared in Book II. Livy casts doubt on Macer's reliability, suggesting that he misrepresented events in order to glorify the Licinii, but notes that he quotes original sources such as the Linen Rolls. According to Macrobius, he credited Romulus with the introduction of intercalation to the Roman calendar.

See also
 Licinius Macer Calvus, his son and a noted poet.

Notes

References

66 BC deaths
1st-century BC Romans
1st-century BC writers
Ancient Roman politicians who committed suicide
Golden Age Latin writers
Latin writers known only from secondary sources
Macer, Gaius
Populares
Year of birth unknown